Lanark County is a county located in the Canadian province of Ontario.  Its county seat is Perth, which was first settled in 1816. 

Most European settlements of the county began in 1816, when Drummond, Beckwith and Bathurst townships were named and initially surveyed. The first farm north of the Rideau was cleared and settled somewhat earlier, in 1790. The county took its name from the town of Lanark in Scotland. Nearly all the townships were named after British public and military figures from the era of early settlement.

History
Lanark County is located on Algonquin/Omàmìwininì traditional territory. Land claims are currently under negotiation.

Bathurst District
In 1824, Lanark County was severed from Carleton County in Bathurst District, and it consisted of the following townships and lands:

When Carleton was withdrawn from the District in 1838, Renfrew County was severed from part of Lanark, but the two remained united for electoral purposes. By 1845, all lands in the District had been surveyed into the following townships:

In 1851, the township of Pakenham was transferred from Renfrew to Lanark.

United Counties of Lanark and Renfrew
Effective January 1, 1850, Bathurst District was abolished, and the "United Counties of Lanark and Renfrew" replaced it for municipal and judicial purposes. The counties remained united for electoral purposes in the Parliament of the Province of Canada, referred to as the County of Lanark, until Renfrew gained its own seat in 1853.

The separation of Renfrew from Lanark began in 1861, with the creation of a Provisional Municipal Council that held its first meeting in June 1861. The United Counties were dissolved in August 1866.

Current constituent municipalities

Smiths Falls is a separated town and is for municipal purposes not part of the county. It is mostly located in Lanark, while its southern part was annexed from the United Counties of Leeds and Grenville.

Geography

The county is located in the sub-region of Southern Ontario named Eastern Ontario.  Geologically, the northern part of the county is in the Canadian Shield and the southern part is in the Great Lakes Basin.  The county has two large rivers, the Mississippi and Rideau, each of which empty into the Ottawa River. The landscape is varied including Canadian Shield (with gneiss, granite and marble) as well as limestone plains, with a variety of tills, sands and clays left from the melting of glaciers in the last ice age.

At the time of settlement, most of the county was covered in temperate deciduous forest; the dominant forest trees included maple, hemlock, oak and beech. Some of the higher ridges in the west of the county were likely once natural fire barrens, with a distinctive fauna and flora. The clearance of forests began with early settlement, at which time one of the important exports from the area was potash, made from the ashes of the trees burned in clearing.

The natural diversity of the landscape supports over 1,200 species of plants in the county flora.  Seventeen areas have been documented as outstanding examples of plant diversity; these include Blueberry Mountain, Burnt Lands Alvar, Clay Bank Alvar, Christie Lake, Murphy's Point Provincial Park and Almonte Town Park.  The county also has 47 provincially significant wetlands.  Some of the largest are Blueberry Marsh (north of Perth), the Innisville Wetlands (upstream of Mississippi Lake) and the Goodwood Marsh south of Carleton Place. In addition to David White's list of 17 areas of plant diversity, Paul Keddy lists 17 special places in the county.  Both lists have the Burnt Lands Alvar, the Christie Lake Barrens and Murphy's Point Provincial Park. Keddy's list adds areas such as Playfairville Rapids, Lavant/Darling Spillway and the Carleton Place Hackberry stand.  Also of interest is an old shoreline which crosses the county diagonally, approximately from Almonte in the northeast to Perth in the southwest. This shoreline was formed about 12,000 years ago near the end of the last ice age when much of the Ottawa Valley was inundated by the Champlain Sea.  Many areas below this old shoreline are flat clay plains, with occasional outcrops of gneiss or limestone ridges.

Some of the distinctive southern animals in the county include five-lined skinks (Ontario's only species of lizard), black ratsnakes and southern flying squirrels. Unusual southern plants include arrow arum, a nationally rare wetland plant found near Mississippi Lake.  The south-facing cliffs over Big Rideau Lake, including Foley Mountain, have a slightly warmer climate, and therefore support an unusual southern flora including shagbark hickory, tall cinquefoil (Potentilla arguta) and a rare fern, blunt-lobed woodsia.  Cliff Bennett provides a list of 26 routes for canoe and kayak exploration of the county.

Demographics

Economy
The county is one of the top centres of maple syrup production in Ontario and describes itself as "The Maple Syrup Capital of Ontario".

Recreation

There are two provincial parks in Lanark County: Murphy's Point Provincial Park on Big Rideau Lake and Silver Lake Provincial Park along Highway 7 near the west end of the county.  The Rideau Trail and Trans-Canada Trail both go through Lanark County.  There are also several conservation areas run by the Mississippi Valley Conservation Authority, the Rideau Valley Conservation Authority, and the Mississippi Madawaska Land Trust. The K&P rail trail goes through the northwest corner of the county.

See also
List of townships in Ontario
List of secondary schools in Ontario#Lanark County

References

Bibliography

External links

 
Counties in Ontario